Covering Islam is a 1981 book by Palestinian author Edward Said, in which he discusses how the Western media distorts the image of Islam. Said describes the book as the third and last in a series of books (the first two were Orientalism and The Question of Palestine) in which he analyzes the relations between the Islamic world, Arabs and East and West, France, Great Britain and the United States.

Covering Islam deals with issues during and after the Iranian hostage crisis, and how the Western media has speculated on the realities of Islamic life. Said questions the objectivity of the media, and discusses the relations between knowledge, power and the Western media.

Synopsis
Said postulates that, if knowledge is power, those who control the modern Western media (visual and print) are most powerful because they are able to determine what people like or dislike, what they wear and how they wear it, and what they should know and must not know about themselves.

Human intellect enables a person to think, ponder, contemplate and question. Intellect is, according to Islam, what makes a person unique as an individual. A human, by nature, is a rational being, but the western media wants a person to be irrational—in the sense of accepting or agreeing to an idea without verifying, thinking about or questioning it.  In other words, says Said, irrationalism means to let one person think and decide for another—to let one person control others.

Said refers to the media's ability to control and filter information as an 'invisible screen', releasing what it wants people to know and blacking out what it does not want them to know. In the age of information, Said argues, it is the media that interprets and filters information—and Said claims that the media has determined very selectively what Westerners should and should not know about Islam and the Muslim world. Islam is portrayed as oppressive (women in Hijab); outmoded (hanging, beheading and stoning to death); anti-intellectualist (book burning); restrictive (bans on post- and extramarital affairs, alcohol and gambling); extremist (focusing on Algeria, Lebanon and of course Egypt); backward (Pakistan, Saudi Arabia and the Sudan); the cause of worldwide conflict (Palestine, Kashmir and Indonesia); and dangerous (Turkey and Iran).

The modern Western media, says Said, does not want people to know that in Islam both men and women are equal; that Islam is tough on crime and the causes of crime; that Islam is a religion of knowledge par excellence; that Islam is a religion of strong ethical principles and a firm moral code; that socially Islam stands for equality and brotherhood; that politically Islam stands for unity and humane governance; that economically Islam stands for justice and fairness; and that Islam is at once a profoundly spiritual and a very practical religion. Said claims that untruth and falsehood about Islam and the Muslim world are consistently propagated in the media, in the name of objectivity, liberalism, freedom, democracy and ‘progress’.

References

 Welty, Gordon. "Review of Edward Said, Covering Islam, Vintage Books, 1997."  Dayton Voice, August 10, 1997.

1981 non-fiction books
English-language books
Political books
Works by Edward Said
Books about Islam and society
Criticism of Islam